The Três Picos State Park is a state park in the state of Rio de Janeiro, Brazil.
It preserves a large, mountainous region of Atlantic Forest.

Location

When created, the Três Picos State Park was divided between the municipalities of Cachoeiras de Macacu (48.92%), Guapimirim (4.21%), Nova Friburgo (19.26%), Silva Jardim (7.53%) and Teresópolis (20.08%) in the state of Rio de Janeiro.
As of 2016 about two thirds of the area was in the municipality of Cachoeiras de Macacu.
The park is named after the Três Picos (Three Peaks) mountains, which reach  in altitude, and are considered to be the center of the Serra do Mar range.
The peaks present over 100 routes of varying levels of difficulty to climbers.
There are dozens of waterfalls of great beauty in Cachoeiras de Macacu.

Environment

The state park is the largest in Rio de Janeiro, and preserves a large portion of Atlantic Forest in excellent condition.
Vegetation ranges from dense sub-montane rainforest to cloud forest and alpine meadows.
It is considered a priority for conservation.
It is home to endangered species such as hawks and cougar (Puma concolor) that require large areas of preserved environment within which to find their prey.
It also includes a variety of arthropods, fish, amphibians and reptiles.

History

The objectives are to ensure preservation of remnants of the Atlantic Forest in the portion of the Serra do Mar in Rio de Janeiro, to recover degraded areas, to preserve rare, endemic and endangered species of native fauna and flora, to integrate with the central Atlantic Forest corridor in the state, to maintain springs and water bodies that supply the cities, and to encourage recreation, environmental education and scientific research where compatible with the other goals.

The park is part of the Central Rio de Janeiro Atlantic Forest Mosaic, created in 2006.
On 31 October 2013 the boundaries were redefined by state law 6.573 with the extinction of the Paraíso Ecological Station and the Jacarandá State Environmental Protection Area and modification of the Bacia dos Frades Environmental Protection Area.
As of 2016 the park covered .

Notes

Sources

State parks of Brazil
Protected areas of Rio de Janeiro (state)
2002 establishments in Brazil